Adare is a village in County Limerick, Ireland, located south-west of the city of Limerick.  Adare is designated as a heritage town by the Irish government.

History
The River Maigue is tidal as far as Adare, with the settlement forming around the eastern bank of the Maigue overlooking the fording point from which the village gets its name. An annalistic reference is made in the medieval Annals of Inisfallen at AI982.4 "The Tree of Mag Adar was broken by Leth Cuinn". Owing to the strategic importance of the river crossing the Desmond castle was built overlooking the site near Ardshanbally (derived from Ard an tSeanbhaile - 'high ground of the old town'), and was first mentioned in 1226. Historically a market town, in the Middle Ages, Adare had three monasteries. Owing to the influence of the Earls of Dunraven, who built the Adare Manor (now a luxury resort hotel) a strict plan was laid out for the village.

Desmond Castle

A castle or fortress is said to have first been built with an ancient ring-fort, by the O'Donovans, rulers of the region into the 12th century, and afterwards to have passed into the possession of the Kildare branch of the FitzGerald dynasty, who may be responsible for the majority of the remains of the present fortress (which occurred with Croom Castle, also on the Maigue). Desmond Castle, as it is popularly known (after the FitzGeralds of Desmond), stands on the north bank of the Maigue. An extensive renovation has been in progress on the castle since 1996 and supervised tours are offered in the summer months.  This is one of a series of significant Desmond properties, which also include Desmond Hall and Castle in Newcastle West, another castle in Askeaton and Castle Matrix near Rathkeale, further west in County Limerick.

Augustinian Priory

Adare's Augustinian Priory was founded in 1316 by John FitzThomas FitzGerald, 1st Earl of Kildare. The Priory was suppressed in the reign of Henry VIII. In 1807, the church of the Priory was given to the local Church of Ireland congregation as the parish church. In 1814, the refectory was roofed and converted into a schoolhouse. Between 1852 and 1854, a second restoration of the church was undertaken by Caroline, Countess of Dunraven.

Franciscan Abbey
The Franciscan friary, also known as the friary of St Michael the Archangel, was founded in 1464 by Thomas Fitz-Maurice, 7th Earl of Kildare and his wife Joan, and completed two years later. It is currently a ruin and is located inside the Adare Manor Golf Club.

Trinitarian Abbey

The Trinitarian Order established their only monastery in Ireland in Adare in 1230. It is believed that the Trinitarian monks who came to Adare may have come from Scotland. The Abbey was restored in 1811 by the first Earl of Dunraven as the Catholic Parish church.

Adare Manor
Adare Manor is a mansion located on lands on the banks of the River Maigue and the former seat of the Earl of Dunraven and Mount-Earl. The present building was built in the early 19th-century in a Tudor-revival style, while retaining part of an earlier structure. It is now the Adare Manor Hotel & Golf Resort, a luxury resort hotel, reopened after an extensive restoration in October 2017.

Architecture

The main street combines typical Irish architecture with the English styled buildings and infrastructure purpose-built for the Dunraven estate as an estate village. Examples of the latter architectural forms include the thatched cottages near the entrance to Adare Manor. The later 20th century additions were designed by Detmar Blow.

Economy

Adare is a tourist destination and the local heritage centre, which gives insight into the history of the village, also hosts a number of craft shops. The village is a wedding and conference venue. Adare has two 18-hole golf courses - the Adare Golf Club, which incorporates a driving range and which was the site of the 2007 and 2008 Irish Open, the Adare Manor Golf Club and a pitch and putt course. Adare also has an equestrian centre, located in Clonshire.

Schools
There are four primary schools in Adare: St Joseph's National School (Catholic, boys), Our Lady's Abbey National School (Catholic, girls), St Nicholas' National School (Church of Ireland, mixed) and Shountrade National School (Catholic, mixed). The village's secondary school, Adare CBS, closed in 1973.

Transport
The main Limerick-Tralee road, the N21 passes through the village, causing persistent heavy congestions.  In late 2015 a corridor for the long-delayed bypass was chosen that realigns the N21 road north of the village as part of a new dual carriageway planned to link Foynes port to Limerick.

Adare is a stop on Bus Éireann's Limerick-Tralee/Killarney bus service and Dublin Coach's Dublin-Tralee/Killarney service. Both run hourly.

The disused "Limerick-Foynes" railway line passes 800 metres (half a mile) to the north-west of the village. Adare railway station, opened on 12 July 1856 by the Limerick & Foynes Railway company, was closed to passengers on 4 February 1963 and to freight on 2 December 1974. The line to Foynes continued to carry freight traffic until it was mothballed in 2001 and has seen no trains since 7 May 2002 when the annual Irish Rail weed spray train visited the line. The line, designated an engineers siding, is still officially open for traffic.

Sports

Adare GAA club was founded in 1929. The senior hurling team has won the county championship in 2001, 2002, 2007, 2008 and 2009. In football, the Club won the County Intermediate Football Title in 2016 and gained promotion back to The Limerick Senior Football Championship. In 2017, Adare won the County Senior Title for the first time, beating Newcastle West in the Final. In 2018, the club went on to retain the title, becoming the first team in Limerick GAA history to win 2 senior titles immediately following success at intermediate level.
The local soccer team is Adare United AFC. The club play at Deer Park Field, situated just off the Blackabbey Road in the village. Founded in 1937, Adare has one of the oldest soccer clubs outside Limerick city. Adare United participate in the Limerick Desmond Schoolboys/Girls League at Under 8, U10, U12, U14 and U16 age groups and in the Limerick Desmond League at Junior (adult) and Youth level. The 2006/07 Season saw the club form its first ladies team, who compete in the Limerick Desmond Ladies League. In the 2009/10 Season, the ladies were runners up in the League Cup, losing on penalties to Glin Rovers FC. The team were also cup finalists the following year, this time in the Desmond Cup but were beaten by Murroe FC. The Under 10 team were Division 3 Champions in the 2008/09 season and Division 4 winners in 2010/11. The Under 8 team completed a league and cup double in 2010/11. The Junior team won promotion from Division Two in the 2008/2009 season and immediately gained promotion to the premier league the following year. Adare Ladies won the Desmond Cup in the 2011/2012 season and were runners-up in League Division 1.
The Irish Open golf championship was staged there in 2007 and 2008. There are two 18-hole golf courses in the village: The Adare Golf Club which is on the grounds of the Adare Manor Hotel, and the Adare Manor Golf Club, which is a separate entity.
The Limerick Cricket Club play in the manor fields complex to the south of the village.
The village also plays a role in the West Limerick athletics scene, with it hosting the Adare 10K run every February since 1994.

Twin towns
Adare has twinning connections to its sister towns in Germany.
 Buchloe, Germany
 Buckow, Germany

See also
 List of towns and villages in Ireland
 Nicholas Peacock

References

External links

General Information on Adare
Obituary of the 7th Earl of Dunraven, Thady Wyndham-Quin
Index of the Earl of Dunraven Papers at the University of Limerick
Adare local area plan (Limerick County Council)(2002)
The Tidy Towns of Ireland "Celebrating 50 years"
 Bunbury, Turtle, Adare Manor: The Renaissance of an Irish Country House (Adare Manor Publishing, 2019) 

 
Towns and villages in County Limerick
Planned communities in the Republic of Ireland